Am Basteir ('the baptizer') is a mountain peak in the northern Cuillin range on the Isle of Skye in Scotland. It forms a narrow blade of rock, which bears comparison with the Inaccessible Pinnacle in the same range.

A scramble of approximately  along the east ridge will bring you to the summit although care should be taken near the top as there is a "bad step", a  notch in the ridge to negotiate. This could be scrambled down until recently but a rockfall now means it must be avoided, downclimbed or abseiled. The bad step is most easily avoided via an elusive moderate scrambling route on the south face but can be reascended (i.e. on descent from the summit) without difficulty. The western end of Am Basteir is vertical, though it is possible for a walker coming from the direction of Bruach na Frìthe to reach the top by skirting below Am Basteir to reach the bealach mentioned above.

At the foot of the western side there is large prominent pinnacle, similar in shape to Am Basteir itself, known as the Basteir Tooth.

References

Munros
Mountains and hills of the Isle of Skye